Alexander A. Sharov (born November 5, 1995) is a Russian professional ice hockey player. He is currently playing with HC Sibir Novosibirsk of the Kontinental Hockey League (KHL).

Sharov made his Kontinental Hockey League debut playing with HC Lada Togliatti during the 2014–15 KHL season.

References

External links

1995 births
Living people
HC Lada Togliatti players
Russian ice hockey forwards
HC Sibir Novosibirsk players
Universiade gold medalists for Russia
Universiade medalists in ice hockey
Competitors at the 2019 Winter Universiade